Rayshawn Lamar Bennett (born February 16, 1991), known professionally as YFN Lucci, is an American rapper, singer, and songwriter from Atlanta, Georgia. In 2014, he signed a record deal with Think It's A Game Entertainment and released his debut mixtape, Wish Me Well. In 2016, he released his second mixtape, Wish Me Well 2, which included the hit single "Key to the Streets" (featuring Migos and Trouble). His debut extended play, Long Live Nut, was released in 2017 and peaked at number 27 on the Billboard 200 chart. The EP's first single "Everyday We Lit" (featuring PnB Rock), has peaked at number 33 on the Billboard Hot 100 and became his highest charting single to date.

In 2018, Bennett released his debut studio album Ray Ray From Summerhill which peaked at number 14 on the Billboard 200. In May 2021, he was amongst 11 others charged in a RICO indictment.

Early life 
Rayshawn Lamar Bennett was born in Atlanta, Georgia. He grew up listening to Atlanta rappers such as T.I., and Jeezy. He discovered his own musical talent at age 16 and was encouraged to take it seriously by rapper Johnny Cinco. Lucci's older brother is also a rapper, who goes by the name YFN KAY.

Career

2014–16: Beginnings and breakthrough 
In December 2014, Lucci signed a record deal with Think It's A Game Entertainment and released his debut mixtape, Wish Me Well. In February 2016, he released the Wish Me Well 2 mixtape, which peaked at number 183 on the US Billboard 200 chart. The mixtape's hit single "Key to the Streets" featuring Migos and Trouble, peaked at number 70 on the US Billboard Hot 100 chart. The official remix version of the song featured 2 Chainz, Lil Wayne and Quavo. "Key to the Streets" was included on XXL magazine's 50 Best Hip-Hop Songs of 2016 list and Vibe magazine's The 60 Best Songs Of 2016 list. The mixtape's second single is "YFN" which was accompanied by a music video. A behind the scenes of "YFN" was filmed by StayOnGrindTV's Director LookImHD and released on Risinghype.com, YouTube.com & WorldStarHipHop.com.

In September 2016, Lucci along with Migos, 21 Savage, Kap G, Young Dolph and Zaytoven was featured on the cover of Rolling Out magazine's "Hidden Hip-Hop Gems of Summer 16" issue. In October 2016, rapper Meek Mill released the track "You Know" featuring Lucci, which peaked at number nine on the Bubbling Under Hot 100 Singles chart and appeared on Mill's DC4 mixtape. In December 2016, Billboard magazine included Lucci in its 10 Hip-Hop and R&B Artists to Watch In 2017 list.

2017–present: Long Live Nut, Ray Ray From Summerhill 

In April 2017, Lucci released his debut extended play, Long Live Nut, featuring guest appearances from Rick Ross, Dreezy, PnB Rock, Lil Durk, Boosie Badazz and YFN Trae Pound. The EP debuted at number 27 on the Billboard 200. The lead single from the project, "Everyday We Lit" featuring PnB Rock, has peaked at number 33 on the Billboard Hot 100.

On March 9, 2018, Lucci released his first studio album entitled Ray Ray From Summerhill. The album features guest appearances from a plethora of acts such as frequent collaborators Dreezy, Rick Ross and YFN Trae Pound.

On February 14, 2020, Lucci released his single "Wet (She Got That...)", which received a remix featuring Mulatto on September 18, 2020. "Wet" served as the lead single from Lucci's mixtape Wish Me Well 3, released in December 2020.

Personal life 
In 2018 and 2020, Bennett was in a publicized on-again, off-again relationship with the daughter of Lil Wayne, Reginae Carter. He fathers 4 children from two different mothers.

Other ventures 
In 2017, Lucci along with artist Jacquees were chosen to star in Sean John's holiday 2017 and spring 2018 campaigns.

Legal issues 
In early 2021, warrants for Bennett's arrest were issued in Atlanta, Georgia, charging him with a December 2020 shooting that left a 28-year-old man dead and another man wounded, Atlanta Police Department (APD) told the press. In addition to being a suspect for the shooting, the APD have also charged Bennett with "aggravated assault and participation in criminal street gang activity." He was arrested on January 13, 2021, after turning himself in to police. Bennett was released on house arrest after posting a $500,000 bond on February 8, 2021.

In May 2021, Bennett is among 12 people charged in a 105-count RICO indictment. Bennett faced charges including racketeering, violating the state's anti-gang law, and possession of a firearm during the commission of a felony. The Atlanta Police Department stated that Bennett was a member of a faction of the Bloods. An attorney for Bennett argued that the rapper was innocent of all charges against him. On June 1, 2021, a Fulton County judge denied Bennett bond.

Artistry 
Discussing how he developed his sing-song style in an interview with Noisey, Lucci said; "Growing up, I always had this high-pitched voice. I couldn't ever sing, you feel me, but I had a little high-pitched voice when I talked loud. I used to listen to Ja Rule. I knew how to rap, and I used to write my verses. And if it don't sound right when I rap it, I sing it.  And it'd sound better. I used to let all my friends hear it, and they were like, 'I like that.' I just ran with it. If I can't rap it, I sing it."

Discography 

Studio Albums
Ray Ray from Summerhill (2018)
Wish Me Well 3 (2020)

References

External links 

 

1991 births
Living people
21st-century American rappers
21st-century African-American male singers
African-American male rappers
African-American male singer-songwriters
American rappers of Jamaican descent
Prisoners and detainees of Georgia (U.S. state)
Rappers from Atlanta
Singer-songwriters from Georgia (U.S. state)
Southern hip hop musicians